Krishnadas Shama, a Gaud Saraswat Brahmin and native of Quelossim in Goa, was the author of Krishna Charitrakatha. According to verses (ovis) 245-250 of this work, it was commenced on 25 April 1526, or Vaishakh Shukla of shake 1448 according to the Hindu calendar. The original manuscript of this work was discovered by Mariano Saldanha in the Public Library of Braga in Portugal (first 130 pp. of codex 773, Marathi MS, Roman script). The work has 19 chapters (ovesvaru) and 3,123 verses (ovis). It is a rendering of the Tenth canto (Adhyaya) of the Bhagavata Purana. It may be the first extant prose work by a Goan in Marathi.

Shama may also be the author of the Konkani texts contained in codices 771 and 772 of the Public Library of Braga. These contain stories in prose from the Ramayana and Mahabharata. These manuscripts were found in Rachol Seminary, in the possession of Dom Francisco Garcia. They were transliterated into Roman script by Jesuit scholars in the 16th century. These may be the first extant prose works in Konkani.

Recognition
The latest building of the Goa State Central Library in Panjim was dedicated to Krishnadas Shama in 2011.

References

Konkani